Hülben is a municipality in the district of Reutlingen in Baden-Württemberg in Germany.

It is located next to the area of the Celtic Heidengraben.

Geography 

Hülben is a municipality on the northern edge of the Swabian Jura, above the spa town of Bad Urach.

Neighbouring communities
The following cities and municipalities are bordering the municipality Hülben, they are (starting from the north) called the clockwise and belong to Reutlingen district or to Esslingen district 1

Neuffen 1, Erkenbrechtsweiler 1, Grabenstetten, Bad Urach and Dettingen an der Erms.

Constituent communities
The municipality Hülben includes the village Hülben and a group of houses.

History

Establishing and territorial affiliation

Hülben was probably founded in the time of the Alemannic conquest between 700 and 800. The village name is a dwelling place name by the two  Hülben , where at that time had settled the first settlers. 1137 Hülben is first mentioned in the Zwiefalter  chronicles. 1265 came Hülben as part of the House of Urach to Württemberg, and became Protestant 1534 after the Battle of Lauffen.

Only in 1866 Hülben had his own parish.

Pietism
Nationally the community became known by the derived from Michael Cullin (* 1540) family of teachers named Kullen. From 1722 to 1966 (until 1939 without interruption) members of the family Kullen worked in the school service of Hülben. From the family Kullen came also the old pietism community, which holds  the "fair Monday hour" till today.

Population
The population figures are census results (1) or official updates of the State Statistical Office (only principal residences).

Coat of arms

Politics

Council
The council Hülben has 12 members. The local elections in Baden-Württemberg 2014 were made in Hülben according to the majority vote, this means that only one list was drawn up. The council consists of the elected honorary councilors and the mayor as chairman. The mayor is entitled to vote in the municipal council.

Mayor

 1922-1951: Ernst Schaude
 1952-1982: Fritz Herter
 1982-2006: Hans Notter
 Since 2006: Siegmund Ganser

Arms
Blazon: "In blue over a silver Wellenschildfuß a golden ammonite."

Old coat of arms
The old coat of arms was awarded on 26 April 1951 by Ministry of the Interior Württemberg-Hohenzollern.

Blazon: "In silver over a black Wellenschildfuß a black bar."

After a council resolution of 12 March 1948, the emblem of the already then no longer predominantly agricultural municipality should include other figures. The Wellenschildfuß refers to the municipality of origin, which is derived from "hülwe" = pool or lake. The bar is reminiscent of the Knights of Dettingen who had possessions in Hülben. The family of Cudi miles de Tettingen led this crest figure.

Natural Monuments
The Hülben stalactite cave was discovered during the construction of national road Bad Urach-Hülben on September 19, 1978, it is a stalactite cave with stalactites and stalagmites. An about 5 m deep shaft leads into the easily accessible part of the cave. This has about room size, but with only partial low altitude.

Regular events
 Hüle-Hock, end August
 Kirchweih Monday hour on Monday after the 3rd Sunday of October
 Feuerwehr Hock, in mid-June
 May Hock, May 1

Arts

Modern art (glasses) outside Hülben

Economy and infrastructure

Traffic
The National Road 250 connects the municipality to the south with Bad Urach. The state road 1250 connects Hülben to the north with Neuffen.

The Public transport is guaranteed by the Verkehrsverbund Neckar-Alb-Donau (NALDO). The community is located in the comb 221.

Personality

Sons and daughters of the town

 Hans Schwenkel (1886-1957), Württemberg State Curator of Nature Conservation during Nazi era
 Gotthilf Kächele (1888-1969), baker champion and politician
 Eberhard Kullen (1911-2007), Federal Railroad official, head of old pietism community Hülben

Personalities who have worked at the site
 Ernst Schaude (1916-2001), jurist, Government Vice-President of the Regierungspräsidium Stuttgart, grew up in Hülben
 Markus Pleuler (born 1970), football player, comes from Hülben

Famous pastors
 Johann Ludwig Fricker (1729-1766), pastor in Hülben
 Wilhelm Zimmermann (1807-1878), pastor in Hülben, professor of German literature and history, a deputy in the Frankfurt National Assembly, Member of Parliament

In Hülben active painters
 Karl Wilhelm Bauerle (1831-1912), a painter at the court of Queen Victoria

Literature
 Hülben. Hrsg.: Gemeinde Hülben. Neuffen, Hülben [1995]. – Mit Abbildungen
 Hülben. Ein Gang durch die Geschichte. Herausgeber: Gemeinde Hülben. Redaktion: Kreisarchivarin Irmtraud Betz. Hülben 1987. – Mit Abbildungen
Pietismus
 Dr. Wilhelm Busch: Aus einem schwäbischen Dorfschulhause (Familie Kullen). 2. Aufl. Elberfeld 1906
 Friedrich Baun: Die Familie Kullen. Zweihundert Jahre im Dienst der Schule zu Hülben (1722–1922). Stuttgart 1922
 Julius Roessle [Rößle]: Von Bengel bis Blumhardt. Gestalten und Bilder aus der Geschichte des schwäbischen Pietismus. 4. Auflage. Metzingen/Württ. 1966, Seite 324–332: "Hülben und die Familie Kullen"
 Gelebter Glaube. Erfahrungen und Lebenszeugnisse aus unserem Land. Ein Lesebuch. Herausgegeben von Werner Raupp. Metzingen/Württemberg 1991, S. 179–188: "Familie Kullen"
 Rolf Scheffbuch: Das Kullen-Schulhaus in Hülben. Hrsg. [und Verleger]: Siegfried Kullen, Hülben, [Hauptstr. 18], 2011, . [Erschienen anlässlich des 200-Jahr-Jubiläums der Erbauung.]

References

External links 

 Webpräsenz der Gemeinde Hülben

Reutlingen (district)